Pedro de Arca, O.S.A. (1545 – October 16, 1645) was the second bishop of the Roman Catholic Diocese of Cebu.

Biography
Pedro de Arca was born in Catadiano Spain and ordained a priest in the Order of Saint Augustine. On June 13, 1604, Pope Paul V appointed him Bishop of Cebu. He was consecrated bishop in 1613 by Diego Vázquez de Mercado, Bishop of the Archdiocese of Manila. He served as Bishop of Cebu until his death on 16 Oct 1645.

While bishop, he was the principal consecrator of Hernando Guerrero, Bishop of Nueva Segovia (1628).

See also
Catholic Church in the Philippines

References

External links and additional sources
 (for Chronology of Bishops) 
 (for Chronology of Bishops) 

1545 births
1645 deaths
Augustinian bishops
Bishops appointed by Pope Paul V
Roman Catholic bishops of Cebu